PP-289 Dera Ghazi Khan-II is a Constituency of Provincial Assembly of Punjab.

General elections 2018

See also
 PP-288 Dera Ghazi Khan-I
 PP-290 Dera Ghazi Khan-III

References

External links
 Election commission Pakistan's official website
 Awazoday.com check result
 Official Website of Government of Punjab

Provincial constituencies of Punjab, Pakistan